Tomas Lindberg (born 16 October 1972), also known as "Tompa" and "Goatspell", is a Swedish vocalist who has fronted many death metal bands, most notably At the Gates. He has been active as a musician and composer since the late 1980s. He also teaches social studies.

Lindberg was ranked number 30 out of 50 of The Greatest Metal Frontmen of All Time by Roadrunner Records.

Career 
He started as a vocalist in the band Grotesque under the name Goatspell. When Grotesque fell apart he started melodic death metal band At the Gates. At the Gates broke up after the 1995 release of the highly acclaimed Slaughter of the Soul album, but reformed in 2007. In 1995 Lindberg provided vocals for three tracks on Ceremonial Oath's "Carpet" while Anders Fridén (In Flames) provided vocals for the other four tracks.

Since then, Lindberg has been involved in many other diverse musical projects within the metal and punk scene.  He has fronted Hide, The Crown, Disfear, Skitsystem and the grindcore supergroup Lock Up, in which he performed alongside Napalm Death members Shane Embury (bass) and Jesse Pintado (guitar) and former Dimmu Borgir drummer, Nicholas Barker. He also did vocals for the Gothenburg-based Sacrilege GBG on their 1996 European tour due to the difficulty for drummer/vocalist Daniel Svensson (In Flames) to do both.

He is earning praise for his Gothenburg-based outfit, The Great Deceiver, far removed from his previous work – a product of the Gothenburg melodic death metal scene mixed with influences from artists such as The Cure and Joy Division.

More recently he has worked with the band Nightrage, but shortly after their second album Descent into Chaos was released in 2005, Lindberg left the band so that a more full-time vocalist (Antony Hämäläinen) could accompany them on tours and studio albums. Lindberg occasionally provides guest vocals as seen on Darkest Hour's "The Sadist Nation", Transistor Transistor's "Young Vampires of New Hampshire" 7", and on Slowmotion Apocalypse's, "The Blessing" on the 2007 'Obsidian' album.

Decibel Magazine credits the logo of black metal band Darkthrone as the work of Lindberg.

Discography 

 Grotesque – In the Embrace of Evil (1989)
 At the Gates – Gardens of Grief (1991)
 At the Gates – The Red in the Sky Is Ours (1992)
 At the Gates – With Fear I Kiss the Burning Darkness (1993)
 At the Gates – Terminal Spirit Disease (1994)
 At the Gates – Slaughter of the Soul (1995)
 At the Gates – At War with Reality (2014)
 At the Gates – To Drink from the Night Itself (2018)
 At the Gates – The Nightmare of Being (2021)
 Skitsystem – Profithysteri (1995)
 Skitsystem – Ondskans ansikte (1996)
 Skitsystem/Wolfpack split – Levande lik (1998)
 Skitsystem – Grå värld/Svarta tankar (1999)
 Guest vocals on Devil Gate Ride on The Crown – Deathrace King (2000)
 The Great Deceiver – Jet Black Art (2000)
 Skitsystem – Enkel tesa till rännstenen (2001)
 Skitsystem – Skitsystem/Nasum Split (2002)
 The Great Deceiver – A Venom Well Designed (2002)
 Lock Up – Hate Breeds Suffering (2002)
 The Crown – Crowned in Terror (2002)
 Disfear –  Misanthropic Generation (2003)
 Guest vocals on "Sadist Nation" from Darkest Hour – Hidden Hands of a Sadist Nation (2003)
 Guest vocals on "Dirty Colored Knife and Under the Spell" from Nail Within – self-titled (2003)
 The Great Deceiver – Terra Incognito (2003)
 Nightrage – Sweet Vengeance (2003)
 Guest vocals on "Cancer of the Mind" from Area 54 – Beckoning of the End (2003)
 Nightrage – Descent into Chaos (2005)
 Lock Up – Play Fast or Die: Live in Japan (2005)
 The Great Deceiver – Life Is Wasted on the Living (2007)
 Guest vocals on "The Blessing" from Slowmotion Apocalypse – Obsidian (2007)
 Disfear – Live the Storm (2008)
 Guest vocals on "White Knives" from Transistor Transistor – Young Vampires of New Hampshire 7" (2008)
 Guest vocals on "Ruling Class Cancelled" from Misery Index – Traitors (2008)
 Necronaut – Necronaut Vocals on Rise of the Sentinel (2010)
 Nightrage – Vengeance Descending (2010)
 Guest vocals on "The Mark of the Beast Part 2" from Salem (Israel band) – Playing God and Other Short Stories (2010)
 Lock Up – Necropolis Transparent (2011)
 Nightrage – Guest vocals on Insidious (2011)
 Converge – guest vocals on Converge / Napalm Death (2012)
 The Blood of Heroes – Guest vocals on "The Waking Nightmare" (2013)
 Guest vocal on Solitary Confinement from Decadawn (2014)
 Science Slam Sonic Explorers – guest vocals on Deep Time Predator (with Invertia) (2015)
 City Keys – Guest vocals on "Condemned", from the Evil Greed EP (2017)
 The Lurking Fear – "Out Of The Voiceless Grave" (2017)
 Orphaned Land – Guest vocals on Only the Dead Have Seen the End of War from Unsung Prophets & Dead Messiahs (2018)
 ColdTears – Guest vocals on Silence Them All (2018)

References

External links 

 https://web.archive.org/web/20051016100708/http://www.soundbase-online.com/incoming/bilder/lindberg.jpg

Swedish heavy metal singers
Living people
1972 births
Musicians from Gothenburg
Lock Up (British band) members
At the Gates members
Nightrage members
21st-century Swedish singers
21st-century Swedish male singers
Liers in Wait members